Giuseppe Polito (born July 14, 1988 in Palermo) is an Italian professional football player currently playing for Lega Pro Seconda Divisione team Pomezia.

External links
 

1988 births
Living people
Italian footballers
Association football midfielders
U.S. Vibonese Calcio players
F.C. Südtirol players